Vanathirayapuram is a village in the Kurinjipadi Taluk of Cuddalore District, Tamil Nadu, in India. It is a village panchayat including the villages of Therkumelur, Thenkuthu, Moolakuppam, Thenkuthu Puthu Nagar, Pinnachi Kuppam, and Kallu Khuzhi. The village is located between the Vadalur and Neyveli township. Economically, the village mainly depends on agriculture income and cropping across the year.

Demographics
As per census 2011, the village had a total population of 1231 with 644 male population and 587 female population. The sex action was 911 and the literacy rate was 75.5. Total household was 318.

Politics
The village is part of the Neyveli State Legislative Assembly constituency and Cuddalore Lok Sabha constituency.

Current MLA - Saba Rajendran (DMK)
 Current MP - T. R. V. S. Ramesh (DMK)

Temples
Popular religious places around the villages are:

Shri Arulmigu Angala Parameswari and Pavadairayan Temple, which is more than 200 years old. There is oonjal (swing) festival being performed every Pournami (full moon) day and an annual 10-day grand festival are celebrated during the month of Chithirai (Apr/May)
Velludaiyanpattu Murugan Temple, where a festival popularly known as "Panguni Uthiram" is celebrated every year in the Month of March /April.

References

Villages in Cuddalore district